The women's singles tournament of the 2011 BWF World Championships (World Badminton Championships) was held from August 8 to 14. Wang Lin was the defending champion.
Wang Yihan won the final against Cheng Shao-Chieh 21–15, 21–10.

Seeds

  Wang Shixian (quarterfinals)
  Wang Yihan (champion)
  Wang Xin (semifinals)
  Jiang Yanjiao (third round)
  Tine Baun (quarterfinals)
  Saina Nehwal (quarterfinals)
  Cheng Shao-Chieh (final)
  Bae Youn-joo (second round)
  Juliane Schenk (semifinals)
  Porntip Buranaprasertsuk (third round)
  Ratchanok Intanon (third round)
  Petya Nedelcheva (third round)
  Sung Ji-hyun (third round)
  Yip Pui Yin (third round, retired)
  Eriko Hirose (second round)
  Sayaka Sato (third round)

Draw

Finals

Section 1

Section 2

Section 3

Section 4

References
Main Draw

2011 BWF World Championships
BWF